Fort Logan H. Roots, commonly known as Fort Roots, is a former U.S. Army post in North Little Rock, Arkansas. It was named in honor of Brevet Lieutenant Colonel Logan Holt Roots, U.S. Volunteers, who served with distinction in the Western Theater of the American Civil War. It was established in 1892 and garrisoned from 1896 to 1913. After World War I, the post was transferred to the Public Health Service for use as a hospital, and in 1921, an Act of Congress authorized the establishment of a hospital for veterans.

Fort Roots is home to the VA's Eugene J. Towbin Healthcare Center and the Law Enforcement Training Center.

History

Establishment and World War I
In 1892, about 1,049 acres was traded to the U.S. government in exchange for the area now known as MacArthur Park Historic District in Little Rock, which had been a military reservation since the 1830s. During World War I, the post served as an officers' training camp.

Health care and veterans affairs
The 66th U.S. Congress transferred Fort Roots to the Public Health Service department on March 4, 1921, for conversion to a veterans hospital for neuropsychiatric disorders. On June 10, 1983, a newly constructed hospital building was dedicated on the existing property.  The main hospital building was formally named the Eugene J. Towbin Healthcare Center in May 1996 in honor of Eugene J. Towbin in recognition of his 40-year career at the veterans medical center. The Center provides long-term, rehabilitative care for eligible veterans.

Although four of the existing hospital structures were demolished, Fort Roots (as the VA campus is still known) retained many of its original military buildings and an  "parade ground" in the center of the original post. Many of the historic buildings flanking the parade ground were listed in the National Register of Historic Places in 1974 in recognition of the area's military history, and virtually the entire campus was listed in 2013 in recognition of its significance as a U.S. Veterans Administration medical center.

See also 
 List of former United States Army installations
 List of Veterans Affairs medical facilities
 List of Veterans Affairs medical facilities by state
 National Register of Historic Places listings in Pulaski County, Arkansas

References

External links

 Eugene J. Towbin Healthcare Center
 James L. Ward Law Enforcement Training Center

1892 establishments in Arkansas
Buildings and structures in North Little Rock, Arkansas
Closed installations of the United States Army
Federal police academies in the United States
Former military buildings and structures
Logan H. Roots
Greek Revival architecture in Arkansas
Historic districts on the National Register of Historic Places in Arkansas
Logan H. Roots
Military installations established in 1892
Military installations closed in 1921
National Register of Historic Places in Pulaski County, Arkansas
Romanesque architecture in the United States
Tourist attractions in North Little Rock, Arkansas
United States Army posts
United States home front during World War I
Veterans Affairs medical facilities
World War I sites in the United States